Global Young Greens (GYG) is an emerging global organisation supporting and consolidating the efforts of young people working towards social justice, ecological sustainability, grassroots democracy and peace. GYG is a joint project of over 70 youth organisations and many hundreds of individuals, including the Federation of Young European Greens, Asia Pacific Young Greens Network, Cooperation and Development Network Eastern Europe, Young Volunteers for the Environment and others. GYG is a non-profit organisation under Belgian law.

History 
The first informal meeting of young greens from around the world was held in Sydney, Australia prior to the 2001 Global Greens Conference,.  Inspired by the Global Young Greens conference of 2001, in 2005 members of the Federation of Young European Greens (FYEG), Campus Greens USA, and many young Green groups and individuals began discussing via email holding another conference. In 2006 two persons began working out of the FYEG office in Brussels. The official founding congress of Global Young Greens was held from January 16–20, 2007 in Nairobi, Kenya. It was attended by 156 people, with 133 voting participants, all under 35. Despite efforts of the organisers, the gender balance was still 2:1 male to female. The numbers were approximately as follows: Africa: 89 (50 Kenyans), Americas: 5, Asia/Pacific: 31, Europe: 26.

Some of the countries that were represented included New Zealand, Germany, Austria, Finland, Sweden, Canada, France, Spain, Tunisia, Kazakhstan, Kyrgyzstan, Nepal, India, Pakistan, Sri Lanka, Vietnam, South Korea, Japan, Nigeria, Uganda, Rwanda, Ethiopia, Mozambique, Benin, Andorra, Czech Republic, Italy, Cyprus and Kenya.

The congress saw agreement on an organisational structure, a list of principals and also elected an organising committee featuring 16 young people from 4 regions: Africa, Americas, Asia Pacific and Europe.

Another informal, two-day GYG meeting was held in São Paulo, Brazil in April 2008, preceding the Global Greens Conference. Around 60 young greens participated.

The Second Congress of the GYG was held August 8–13, 2010 in the German capital Berlin. Over 100 delegates from 48 nations participated in the Congress which lasted for 6 days and included dozens of workshops, several high-level panel debates as well as alternative approaches to exchanging ideas and learning from each other.  In Berlin, the structures of the network were revised.
Impressions

The third and fourth congresses took place alongside that of Global Greens, in Dakar and Liverpool respectively.

Principles 

Membership is open to people 35 and under who identify as Green. Green principles are generally known as “the four principles”:
 ecological sustainability
 social justice
 grassroots democracy
 peace
But this is merely the tip of the iceberg- for a full understanding of what it means to be Green, one and all should read the Global Greens Charter which is endorsed by GYG.

Additionally, the Global Young Greens are striving for the following principles on all levels (local, national, regional, global):

 Protection and restoration of the environment and respect towards animals
 Sustainable, equitable and just development
 Social Justice
 Grassroots, participatory and global democracy, and in particular empowering young people to participate and build more democratic societies
 Peaceful and non-military conflict resolution, arms control, disarmament
 Gender justice, empowerment of women
 Inter-generational justice, empowerment of youth and children
 Freedom from discrimination on any grounds whatsoever, and equality for all
 Empowerment of marginalised and disadvantaged people.
 Just globalisation and fair trade
 Personal freedom on the basis of universal human rights
 The right of all people to self-determination particularly indigenous people.

Objectives 
The objectives of GYG are to:
 Empower young people within the framework of participatory democracy
 Create a space for young people to be active without being dominated by older generations
 Address inequalities between organizations and individuals
 Forge strong links between sectors and organizations
 Further the Green principles on planet Earth

Steering Committee (SC) 

At the 2017 Congress in Liverpool, the Steering Committee was reduced in size to eight, with two representatives from each region. New Steering Committee members have been periodically elected since then.

The current members of the Steering Committee are:
 Fabiana Zanutti (Argentina)
 Janmejai Tiwari (India)
 Salome Gikonyo (Kenya)
 Liliane Pollmann (Germany)
 Ali Khademolhosseini (Germany)
  Jung Lin (Taiwan)
 Soulymane Ouedraogo (Burkina Faso) 
Members of the SC elected in Dakar were (until the congress in Liverpool):
Alex Surace (Australia),
Amy Tyler (Australia),
Bart Dhondt (Belgium)
Bernardo Estacio (Venezuela),
Forget Chinomona (Zimbabwe),
Jaime Andres Carrero Suarez (Colombia),
Julia Duppre (Brasil),
Michaela Prassl (Austria),
Nassima Guettal (Algeria),
Perlo Michel (Senegal),
Robyn Lewis (Australia),
Rose Wachuka (Kenya),
Sarah Benke (Germany),
Tanya Gutmanis (Canada),
Teo Abaishavili (Georgia),
Yangki Imade Suara (Indonesia),

Previous members of the SC elected in Berlin (until the Congress in Dakar) were:
Adam Sommerfeld (Canada),
Alex Surace (Australia),
Ann Bulimu (Kenya),
Anna Kavalenka (Belarus),
Clarence Chollet (Switzerland),
Chung-Ming Wang (Taiwan),
Jesùs López (Venezuela),
Kalpana Ambepitiya (Sri Lanka),
Kelvin Kaunda (Zambia),
Lukas Beiglböck (Austria),
Mareike Rehl (Germany),
Masami Muramatsu (Japan),
Roberta Morena Santos (Brazil),
Roselin Monogla (Benin),
Sandra Guzman (Mexico).

Members of the first SC elected at the founding congress in Nairobi were: 
Douglas Arege (Kenya),
Caroline Ayling (Australia),
Andreas Birnstingl (Austria),
Marie Madeline Boni (Benin),
Raju Pandit Chhetri (Nepal),
Eric Dombou (Cameroun),
Murtaza Mir Ghulam (Pakistan),
Andrea Horan (Canada),
Ognyan Kovachev (Bulgaria),
Rim Nour (Tunisia),
Janna Schönfeld (Germany),        
Sarah Trichet Allaire (France),
Elena Zakirova (Kirgisistan),        
Juan Manuel Zorraquín (Argentina).

See also

Biodiversity
Conservation movement
Direct democracy
Environmental movement
Ecology
Ecosystem
Global Greens Charter
Global Warming
Grassroots democracy
Human overpopulation
List of environmental organizations
Natural environment
Participatory democracy
Sustainability

References

External links
official website
Statutes of the GYG
Global Greens 

Youth wings of green parties
Young Greens